Henry Myers "Jack" Wheaton (July 5, 1886 – December 12, 1944) was an American football player and coach. He played for Yale University from 1907 to 1909. Wheaton was the 13th head football coach at the University of Kansas, serving for one season, in 1914, and compiling a record of 5–2–1.

Head coaching record

References

1886 births
1945 deaths
American football halfbacks
Kansas Jayhawks football coaches
Yale Bulldogs football players
People from Beaver Falls, Pennsylvania